Elisabeth Demleitner (born 23 September 1952 in Kochel am See) is a West German luger who competed during the 1970s and early 1980s. Competing in three Winter Olympics, she won the bronze medal in the women's singles event at the 1976 Winter Olympics in Innsbruck.

Demleitner also won four medals in the women's singles event at the FIL World Luge Championships with one gold (1971), two silvers (1974, 1979), and one bronze (1970). Additionally, she won three medals in the women's singles event at the FIL European Luge Championships with two golds (1977, 1978) and one silver (1972).

References
Fuzilogik Sports - Winter Olympic results - Women's luge

Hickok sports information on World champions in luge and skeleton.
List of European luge champions 
SportQuick.com information on World champions in luge 
 

1952 births
Living people
German female lugers
Lugers at the 1972 Winter Olympics
Lugers at the 1976 Winter Olympics
Lugers at the 1980 Winter Olympics
Olympic bronze medalists for West Germany
Olympic medalists in luge
Olympic lugers of West Germany
Medalists at the 1976 Winter Olympics
People from Bad Tölz-Wolfratshausen
Sportspeople from Upper Bavaria